James H. Parker House is a historic home located at Enfield, Halifax County, North Carolina. It was built in 1882, and is a two-story, three bay, Italianate-style frame dwelling.  It has a side-gable roof with overhanging eaves and features a one-story porch with a low-hipped roof supported by paired (tripled at the corners) chamfered columns topped by built-up and scroll-sawn brackets.  Also on the property is a contributing smokehouse (c. 1855, 1882).

It was listed on the National Register of Historic Places in 1994.

References

Houses on the National Register of Historic Places in North Carolina
Italianate architecture in North Carolina
Houses completed in 1882
Houses in Halifax County, North Carolina
National Register of Historic Places in Halifax County, North Carolina
1882 establishments in North Carolina